Büyükanafarta is a village in the Eceabat District of Çanakkale Province in Turkey. Its population is 196 (2021).

References

Villages in Eceabat District